The 1985 NCAA Division I Outdoor Track and Field Championships were contested May 27−June 1, 1985 at Memorial Stadium at the University of Texas at Austin in Austin, Texas in order to determine the individual and team national champions of men's and women's collegiate Division I outdoor track and field events in the United States. 

These were the 63rd annual men's championships and the fourth annual women's championships. This was the Longhorns' fourth time hosting the event and the first since 1980. 

Arkansas and Oregon topped the men's and women's team standings, respectively; it was the Razorbacks' first men's team title and the first for the Ducks' women's program. This was Arkansas' first title before their run of nine consecutive championships during the 1990s.

Team results 
 Note: Top 10 only
 (H) = Hosts

Men's standings

Women's standings

References

NCAA Men's Outdoor Track and Field Championship
NCAA Division I Outdoor Track and Field Championships
NCAA
NCAA Division I Outdoor Track and Field Championships
NCAA Division I Outdoor Track and Field Championships
NCAA Women's Outdoor Track and Field Championship